Luke Wins Ye Ladye Faire is a 1917 American short comedy film starring Harold Lloyd.

Cast
 Harold Lloyd - Lonesome Luke
 Bebe Daniels
 Snub Pollard
 Bud Jamison
 Charles Stevenson - (as Charles E. Stevenson)
 W.L. Adams
 Estelle Harrison
 Sidney De Gray
 Gus Leonard
 Lottie Case
 Dorothea Wolbert - (as Dorothy Wolbert)
 Maybelle Beringer
 Brownie Brownell
 Rose Eghers
 Alice Davenport - (as Mrs. Davenport)
 Clara Lucas
 George F. Marion
 H. Smith

See also
 Harold Lloyd filmography

References

External links

1917 films
1917 short films
American silent short films
American black-and-white films
1917 comedy films
Films directed by Hal Roach
Silent American comedy films
Lonesome Luke films
American comedy short films
1910s American films